This page documents all tornadoes confirmed by various weather forecast offices of the National Weather Service in the United States in June 2019. Tornado counts are considered preliminary until final publication in the database of the National Centers for Environmental Information.

United States yearly total

June

June 1 event

June 2 event

June 3 event

June 4 event

June 5 event

June 6 event

June 7 event

June 8 event

June 9 event

June 11 event

June 12 event

June 13 event

June 14 event

June 15 event

June 16 event

June 17 event

June 18 event

June 19 event

June 20 event

June 21 event

June 22 event

June 23 event

June 24 event

June 25 event

June 27 event

June 29 event

June 30 event

July

July 1 event

July 3 event

July 4 event

July 5 event

July 6 event

July 8 event

July 9 event

July 10 event
Event was associated with Hurricane Barry.

July 11 event

July 12 event

July 14 event
Event was associated with Hurricane Barry.

July 15 event

July 16 event

July 17 event

July 18 event

July 19 event

July 20 event

July 21 event

July 22 event

July 23 event

July 25 event

July 26 event

July 27 event

July 28 event

July 30 event

August

August 2 event

August 4 event

August 5 event

August 6 event

August 7 event

August 8 event

August 9 event

August 10 event

August 11 event

August 12 event

August 13 event

August 15 event

August 17 event

August 18 event

August 20 event

August 21 event

August 22 event

August 23 event

August 24 event

August 26 event

August 29 event

See also
 Tornadoes of 2019
 List of United States tornadoes in May 2019
 List of United States tornadoes from September to October 2019

Notes

References 

2019 natural disasters in the United States
2019-related lists
Tornadoes of 2019
Tornadoes
2019, 1